"Please Don't Go" is a song by American singer Tank. It was written and produced along with Lonny Bereal for his third studio album Sex, Love & Pain (2007). It was released by  Blackground Records as the album's first single. The single sat at number one on the US Billboard Adult R&B Songs chart for more than six weeks.

Music video
On December 31, 2007, the music video for "Please Don't Go" appeared at number 94 on BET's Notarized: Top 100 Videos of 2007 countdown.

Remix
The official remix is called, "Please Don't Go (The TGT Remix)", and features TGT bandmates Ginuwine and Tyrese Gibson, this is TGT's first single as a group.

Charts

Weekly charts

Year-end charts

References

2006 songs
2007 singles
Tank (American singer) songs
Blackground Records singles
Song recordings produced by the Underdogs (production team)
Songs written by Lonny Bereal
Songs written by Tank (American singer)